The Deer Lakes School District is a small, suburban,  K-12 public school district near Pittsburgh which covers East Deer, Frazer, and West Deer townships in Allegheny County, Pennsylvania. Deer Lakes School District encompasses approximately 41 square miles. According to 2000 federal census data, it serves a resident population of 14,211 people. In 2009, the district residents' per capita income was $19,918, while the median family income was $50,671.

The district operates four schools: Curtisville Elementary School (K-2nd), East Union Intermediate Center (3rd-5th), Deer Lakes Middle School (6th–8th) and Deer Lakes High School (9th–12th). The district also operates a preschool program.

See also
 List of school districts in Pennsylvania

References

School districts in Allegheny County, Pennsylvania
Education in Pittsburgh area